The Gangneung Oval (Korean: 강릉 스피드 스케이팅 경기장) is a speed skating oval in South Korea, which was used for the speed skating competitions at the 2018 Winter Olympics. The building of the oval was started in September 2013. The venue consists of a double track 400 metre rink and has a capacity of 8000 seats. It has three floors above ground and two underground levels. The original plan was to build the venue at the Gangneung Science Park, but because there was limited space due to the number of local businesses taking the opportunity to relocate, the oval was built in the Gangneung Olympic Park, in the vicinity of the Gangneung Ice Arena and Gangneung Hockey Centre.

Construction of the facility was started on 29 October 2014. The speed skating rink was delivered by January 2017, in time for the first event in February: 2017 World Single Distance Speed Skating Championships.

Track records

Men

Women

References

Indoor arenas in South Korea
Olympic speed skating venues
Indoor speed skating venues
Venues of the 2018 Winter Olympics
Proposed sports venues in South Korea
Sports venues in Gangneung
2017 establishments in South Korea
Sports venues completed in 2017